Mycelium, the fungal equivalent of roots in plants, has been identified as an ecologically friendly substitute to a litany of materials throughout different industries, including but not limited to packaging, fashion and building materials. Such substitutes present a biodegradable alternative (also known as a "Living Building Material") to conventional materials.

Mycelium was most notably first examined as an ecologically friendly material alternative in 2007. It was widely popularized by Eben Bayer and Gavin McIntyre, through their work developing mycelium packaging and founding their company, Ecovative. during their time at Rensselaer Polytechnic Institute. Since its inception, the material function has diversified into many niches.

Species and Biological Structures 

Mycelium-based composites require a fungi and substrate. “Mycelium” is a term referring to the network of branching fibers, called hyphae, that are created by a fungus to grow and feed. When introduced to a substrate, the fungi will penetrate using their mycelium network, which then breaks down the substrate into basic nutrients for the fungi. By this method, the fungi can grow. For mycelium-based composites, the substrate is not fully broken down during this process and is instead kept intertwined with the mycelium.

The main components of fungi are chitin, polysaccharides, lipids, and proteins. Different compositional amounts of these molecules change the properties of the composites. This is also true for different substrates. Substrates that have higher amounts of chitin and are harder for the mycelium to break down and lead to a stiffer composite formation.

Commonly used species of fungi to grow mycelium are aerobic basidiomycetes, which include Ganoderma sp., Pleurotus sp., and Trametes sp. Basidiomycetes have favorable properties as fungi for creating mycelium based composites because they grow at a relatively steady and quick pace, and can use many different types of organic waste as substrates. Some characteristics that these species differ in are elasticity, water absorption, and strength.

As an example, Trametes hirsuta forms a thicker outer layer of mycelium than Pleurotus ostreatus. This allows the Trametes hirsuta composite to remain flexible and stable in high moisture environments. Additionally, Ganoderma lucidum exhibited higher elasticity, even with different types of substrates. Different combinations of fungi, substrate, and environmental conditions can all affect the properties of the resulting composite; this area of research continues to be explored as the applications for mycelium-based composites expand.

Mechanical Properties 
For most man-made materials there is a high degree of control in the processing methods of the final product leading to normalized properties. In the case of these mycelium based materials there is less control, because of these materials properties vary significantly and depend not only on the processing of the material but also the growth conditions of the mycelium as well.

Mycelium can also be combined with other natural materials to form bio-composites. These bio-composites will have different properties than the pure materials.

From the article Morphology and mechanics of fungal mycelium, samples were taken from Ecovative Design, LLC and prepared in a specific manner for mechanical testing. Their process begins with introducing the mycelium to calcium and carbohydrates in a filter patch bag where it is allowed to grow over the course of 4–6 days. After this, the mycelium is divided into smaller pieces in order to maintain uniform density and growth. The mycelium is then packed into molds with more growth nutrients that are left for 4 days with special adjustments to temperature, humidity, oxygen, and other factors. Once finished, the samples are taken in sheets and dried at high temperatures to deactivate the growing process. These are the samples that are subjected to mechanical testing.

The mechanical tests included uniaxial tension and compression, conducted using a specific testing machine and performed in ambient conditions. For the tensile tests, dog bone specimens of dimensions 200 mm × 6 mm × 3.5 mm were used. Cuboid specimens of dimensions 20 mm × 20 mm × 16 mm were tested under compression. The strain rate chosen was 4 × 10−4 per second until failure for tensile tests whereas compressive samples were deformed at a rate of 6.25 × 10−3 per second ranging from 2% to 20%.

Manufacturing and Growth Techniques 
The first step in the manufacturing of usable mycelium based materials is growing the raw materials. Mycelium needs a wet environment with sufficient substrate to be grown, and as touched on earlier the difficulty to break down the sugars from the substrate will lead to a tougher material driven mostly by the chitin concentration. With an easier substrate to digest the mycelium will grow faster and conversely have less toughness.

The natural growth pattern of mycelium is a tight network that already has a leathery quality and through compressive manufacturing these qualities can be accentuated and used for leather. For most other uses of mycelium, the fungi are harvested, dried then chopped. In order to reconstitute it and make the material less brittle it is rehydrated and sometimes combined with other natural materials like flax, hemp, and many others.

With the predicted growth in the mycelium based materials market a lot of research is going towards optimizing growth. Differing membranes, light sources, spore density, substrate and substrate moisture concentration.

Applications

Packaging 
IKEA has committed to mycelium packaging, making a deal with Ecovative acknowledging the damage that comes from polystyrene packaging and the time it takes the decompose. Plastic foams can take hundreds of years to decompose whereas mushroom based materials can decompose in a few week. At Ecovative, they grow mushroom packaging known as MyoComposite which can be grown in less than a week where this manufacturing starts at the Ecovative Design foundry in Green Island, New York. Ecovative partners with multiple local farmers in order to source agricultural products that get turned into packaging. The agricultural materials are cleaned and sorted into molds where the fungi is added and will grow around the material. Once the fungus grows throughout the mold, the final packaging is specially treated to stop the growth process.

According to another company, Grown Bio, mycelium based packaging also has advantages because of the versatility of design shapes as well as having a high shock absorbance and insulation properties. They use a 3D printed reusable mold made from a biopolymer to template their products which are then filled with agricultural waste, water, and lastly the mycelium. The entire process takes a week and once the packaging has served its use, it breaks down and can be used as fertilizer.

In 2012 Ecovative partnered with Sealed Air, at the time a $7.6 billion global company best known for bubble wrap and other packaging, to license their process for making mycelium-based packaging material.

Building Materials 
Mycelium based composites have not yet been widely adapted as construction replacements for bricks, synthetic foams, or wood. However, their potential for use has been studied in laboratories, and the results from experiments comparing bio-composites and current materials show that bio-composites do have some advantages over traditional materials.

In order to form the structures of the composites, mycelium needs a substrate to grow into. To fabricate these mycelium based composites outside of natural processes, options for substrates include common “left-over” materials such as wood and straw. Recycling waste products contributes to the mycelium based composites' low cost and environmental-friendliness over the current methods and materials.

The main determining factor of the composites’ properties is the type of substrate used. However, the growth conditions and moisture content can also alter the composites' characteristics. To initiate the mycelium growth into the substrate, mycelium is first grown separately and then combined with water and the substrate in a heavily monitored and sterile environment. The mycelium growth can be halted by sterilizing the composite. This is necessary to prevent the mycelium from completely digesting the substrate.

In a study comparing lightweight expanded clay aggregate (LECA) and expanded vermiculite (EV), two materials used to make concrete, to a mycelium grown brick, the mycelium grown brick was found to be a better insulator. These results are similar when comparing a different mycelium based composite with extruded polystyrene. The thermal insulation and mechanical compression properties were found to be respectively better than and equivalent to the extruded polystyrene.

However, there are some unwanted consequences of the mycelium based composites' structure. The first is the novelty of these materials. They are not yet accepted as replacements for common construction materials because researchers are still working to understand their properties and how these properties are affected by time, environmental conditions, substrate, and mycelium species. Mycelium based composites also have issues with water absorption. Too much water absorption will lead the composites to fail under their mechanical loads. The relationship between density and water absorption was analyzed to find if increasing the composite's density will protect the structure in high humidity environments. The results found that composites with a higher density were slightly affected by the levels of humidity, but remained mechanically sound by the standard necessary for construction materials.

Acoustic Dampening 
As with other common building applications, mycelium based materials have also been considered for the application of acoustic dampening. Some species recently under particular consideration include Pleurotus ostreatus (Oyster Mushrooms) and many individual species from the phylum class Basidiomycetes, the latter class being known to have mycelium bodies composed primarily of chitin.

In order to construct said acoustic panels, the filamentous hyphae of the fungal body must be isolated, harvested and processed. This can be done through careful control of humidity, temperature (85-95F), atmospheric  concentration (5-7%) and chemical/hormonal additives (forskolin/10-oxo-trans-8-decenoic acid (ODA)), in order to not only increase the volume of growth but also encourage the resultant growth to consist of a higher percentage of useful biopolymer material. Fine control over the proportion  of cross linkages within the resulting chitin biopolymer is also possible.

To construct a panel of acoustic dampening material, the fungus can be mechanically suspended within a rigid chamber, and allowed to grow to fill the space. After the space has been filled, the mycelium is compressed and allowed to grow again into the resultant space, after which the product is dried and post processed for specific applications (embossing or decorative purposes).

Studies have found that the resultant paneling, when compared to conventional acoustic dampening materials like foam, cork, felt, cotton and ceiling tiles, displayed comparable acoustic absorption in frequencies around 3000 Hz and above, while falling short in performance at frequencies below 3000 Hz. Performance of any given panel is highly dependent on the mix of substrate, species and other previously mentioned variables, and yield varying absorbance profiles.

The industry niche of designing mycelium based acoustic damping panels is currently being developed by companies like Mogu, pursuing the market with their FORESTA acoustic panel system.

Fashion and Cosmetics 
Within the contemporary fashion industry there has been a push for more ethically sourced materials in order to alleviate environmental concerns. To fulfill these needs, companies like Mycoworks and Ecovative have developed sustainable materials to substitute for leather of varying thicknesses and applications. Beyond textiles, mycelium based materials have also found use for substitution in makeup wedges, eye masks and sheet masks due to the materials highly variable mechanical properties.

Many different processes can be used to create said materials, with a variety of fungal species (Ganoderma spp., Perenniporia spp., Pycnoporus spp., etc.), however generally textiles and other polymeric materials are derived from a growth phase, harvesting phase and pressing phase to create the desired sheet thickness, post processing being used to differentiate the material for specific tasks.

In the Media 
Mycelium alternatives to packaging have become very popular since its inception, for example, with Ecovative raising $60 million in 2021 and licensing its technology for manufacturing worldwide. Since its founding, Ecovative has gotten substantial media coverage in online newspapers and articles and has grown into a company that Forbes values at more than $10 million. Times union wrote an article in 2012 titled “Ecovative keeps growing,” which discusses their growth from the two co-founders to having 45 full-time employees and a new manufacturing plant in Green Island, New York.

Another article by CNN Money from 2011, 5 years after the company's initial founding entitled “Car parts made of mushrooms,” details how Ecovative is battling the polystyrene industry with its mycelium based packaging foam. The mushroom packaging company Ecovative was included in the World Economic Forum's Technology Pioneers of 2011.

Early coverage includes an article by the National Renewable Energy Laboratory published in 2009 entitled, “Generation-Y Start-up Stuns NREL Growth Forum”. This article details NREL's 2009 Clean Energy Industry Growth Forum and how Ecovative won first place out of 34 competing companies from 285 applicants.

Acknowledged again in 2013, a New Yorker article entitled “Form and Fungus: Can mushrooms help us get rid of Styrofoam?” explores Ecovative's founders and the advantages of their products. The article describes the main component of this mycelium, Chitin. Polystyrene foams break down over long periods of time and one of its byproducts, styrene is listed as a possible human carcinogen by the Department of Health and Human Services (DHHS), National Toxicology Program (NTP).

References 

Materials science

WikiProject Fungi